Safdie Rabines Architects is an American architecture, interiors and urban design firm based in San Diego, California. The firm works in public and private sectors on projects of varying contexts and scales, including municipal; academic; bridges and infrastructure; single and multifamily/mixed-use residential; and large urban master plans.

History and Leadership
Safdie Rabines Architects was established by Ricardo Rabines and Taal Safdie, AIA, who met while enrolled in University of Pennsylvania School of Design’s Master of Architecture program. Rabines is of Peruvian descent; and Safdie, daughter of architect Moshe Safdie, had spent years living in Montreal, Quebec, Canada at Habitat 67, the model community and housing complex designed by her father. The pair graduated in 1986 and landed in New York, working with firms such as Kohn Pedersen Fox and Pei Cobb Freed. They married in 1989, moved to San Diego, CA in 1990, and established Safdie Rabines Architects in 1993. An Interiors division, SRI, was added in 2010. Architect Eric Lindebak became a firm partner in 2017, and Brett Milkovich in 2022. As of late 2021, the firm employed over 50 architects, designers, interior designers and administrative personnel.

Select Projects

Completed Projects
 Access Youth Academy - San Diego, CA (2021)
 North Torrey Pines Living and Learning Neighborhood - UC San Diego, La Jolla, CA (2020)
 Extended Learning Building - North City San Marcos, CA (2020)
 Gilman Bridge - La Jolla, CA (2019)
 Junction 9 in Lusail City - Doha, Qatar (2016)
 Lusail Pedestrian Bridges - Doha, Qatar (2016)
 Merge CV - Carmel Valley, CA (2017)
 National City Aquatic Center – National City, CA (2016)
 Sellwood Bridge - Portland, OR (2016)
 National City Aquatic Center – National City, CA (2016)
 Block C – North City San Marcos, CA (2016)
 The QUAD – North City San Marcos, CA (2014)
 Casa Madrona Renovation – Sausalito, CA (2014)
 North City Master Plan - San Marcos, CA (2014)
 Mercado del Barrio – San Diego, CA (2013)
 Oceanside Harbor Facility - Oceanside, CA (2013
 Lincoln Acres Library – National City, CA (2013)
 La Jolla Country Day School - San Diego j, CA (2013)
 Rose Creek Bikeway Bridge - San Diego, CA (2012)
 Structural and Materials Engineering Building – UC San Diego (2012)
 Court of Sciences Student Center – UC Los Angeles (2012)
 Colfax Bridge - Los Angeles, CA (2011)
 Harbor Drive Pedestrian Bridge - San Diego, CA (2011)
 Center Street Bridge - Des Moines, IA (2010)
 Robert Paine Scripps Seaside Forum at Scripps Institution of Oceanography - UC San Diego (2009)
 Baldwin Hills Scenic Overlook and Culver City Stairs - Los Angeles, CA (2009)
 Lake Hodges Pedestrian Bridge - Escondido, CA (2009)
 Northwest Division Police Station – Del Mar, CA (2007)
 North Torrey Pines Road Bridge - San Diego, CA (2005)
 Eleanor Roosevelt College - UC San Diego (2003) 
 Scripps Crossing Pedestrian Bridge - San Diego, CA (1993)
 North Torrey Pines Road Bridge - San Diego, CA (2005)
 La Jolla Country Day School - San Diego, CA
 Eleanor Roosevelt College - UC San Diego (2003) 
 Scripps Crossing Pedestrian Bridge - San Diego, CA (1993)

Projects In Progress 
 Marine Conservation Facility at Scripps Institution of Oceanography - UC San Diego 
 KPBS Renovation in San Diego, CA 
 Epstein Family Amphitheater at UC San Diego, La Jolla, CA
 Evora in Las Vegas, NV
 East Village Green in Downtown San Diego, CA

Planning and Visioning
 Evora Vegas - Las Vegas, NV
 North Torrey Pines Living and Learning Neighborhood at UC San Diego - La Jolla, CA
 UC San Diego Expanded Core Visioning Study - La Jolla, CA
 UC San Diego East Campus Health Sciences Visioning Study - La Jolla, CA
 Crystal Flats - Bentonville, AR
 North City Master Plan - San Marcos, CA
 Sixth Street Viaduct - Los Angeles, CA

Awards and Publications

Publications
The firm's work has been featured in the New York Times, Domus, ARCHITECT Magazine, ArchDaily, Sunset Magazine, Residential Architect, World Architecture News and several other publications.

Books
 Public Construction,  ArtPower (2012)
 I gnite: The Art of Lighting,  Lighting Design Alliance (2012)
 Pure Luxury: World's Best Houses,  Images Publishing (2012)
 Mountains and Openings Residence Design,  Cepiec Publishing (2011)
 21st Century Houses: 150 of the World's Best,  Images Publishing (2010)
 Perspectives on Design California: Creative Ideas Shared by Leading Design Professionals,  Panache Partners (2010)
 The New Wood House, Bulfinch Press (2005)
 New Terrace Design,  Daab  (2005)
 The Simple Home, Taunton Press (2007)
 The Barefoot Home, Taunton Press (2006)
 Outdoor Spaces, Harper Collins  (2006)
 Houses Now,  Links Books (2006)
 Tree Houses by Architects,  Harper Design International (2004)
 Houses on the Edge, Harper Collins (2003)
 House Beautiful: Sensational Storage Solutions, Hearst Books (2003)
 Bridging the World,  Bridge Ink (2003)
 Internacional Casas San Diego,  Kliczkowski Publishers (1996)
 Detailing Light,  Whitney Library of Design (1995)

Awards
In 2006, Safdie and Rabines received the Residential Architect "Rising Stars" Leadership Award. Since then, the firm's work has been recognized with over 75 awards for architecture, urban design and master planning by entities including the American Institute of Architects, American Society of Landscape Architects, American Planning Association. In 2017, the National City Aquatic Center was awarded an Orchid for Architecture by the San Diego Architectural Foundation.

References

Architecture firms based in California